State related agencies of the Commonwealth of Pennsylvania.

Agencies
Pennsylvania Attorney General
Pennsylvania Auditor General
Pennsylvania Board of Probation and Parole
Pennsylvania Department of Aging
Pennsylvania Department of Agriculture
Pennsylvania Department of Banking
Pennsylvania Department of Community and Economic Development
Pennsylvania Department of Conservation and Natural Resources
 Bureau of Forestry
 Bureau of State Parks
 Office of Conservation Science
Pennsylvania Natural Heritage Program
Wild Resource Conservation Program
Pennsylvania Department of Corrections
Pennsylvania Department of Drug and Alcohol Programs
Pennsylvania Department of Education
 Pennsylvania Intermediate Units (IU)
 State Library of Pennsylvania
Pennsylvania Department of Environmental Protection
Pennsylvania Department of General Services
Pennsylvania Department of Health
Pennsylvania Department of Human Services
Pennsylvania Department of Insurance
Pennsylvania Department of Labor and Industry
Pennsylvania Department of Military & Veterans Affairs
 Pennsylvania National Guard (PANG)
 Pennsylvania Air National Guard
 Pennsylvania Army National Guard
Pennsylvania Department of Revenue
Pennsylvania Department of State
Pennsylvania Department of Transportation
Pennsylvania Emergency Management Agency
Pennsylvania Higher Education Assistance Agency
Pennsylvania Housing Finance Agency
Pennsylvania Municipal Retirement System
Pennsylvania Office of Administration
Pennsylvania Office of General Counsel
Pennsylvania Public School Employees' Retirement System
Pennsylvania Public Utility Commission
Pennsylvania State Employees' Retirement System
Pennsylvania State Constable's Office
Pennsylvania State Police
Pennsylvania State System of Higher Education
Pennsylvania State Treasurer

Offices
Pennsylvania Office of Open Records
Office of Administrative Law Judge
Pennsylvania Office of Strategic Services
Office of the Pennsylvania First Lady
Office of the Pennsylvania Governor
Office of the Pennsylvania Lieutenant Governor
Office of the Pennsylvania State Fire Commissioner
Pennsylvania Governor's Office of Health Care Reform
Pennsylvania Office of Consumer Advocate
Pennsylvania Office of Financial Education
Pennsylvania Office of Inspector General
Pennsylvania Office of Public Liaison
Pennsylvania Office of the Budget
Pennsylvania Office of the Victim Advocate

Commissions & Councils 
Pennsylvania Civil Service Commission
Pennsylvania Commission on Crime and Delinquency
Pennsylvania Fish and Boat Commission
Pennsylvania Game Commission
 Pennsylvania Gaming Control Board
Pennsylvania Governor’s Commission on Children & Families
Pennsylvania Governor's Advisory Commission on African American Affairs
Pennsylvania Governor's Advisory Commission on Asian American Affairs
Pennsylvania Governor's Advisory Commission on Latino Affairs
Pennsylvania Governor's Advisory Council for Hunting, Fishing & Conservation
Pennsylvania Governor's Advisory Council on Rural Affairs
Pennsylvania Governor's Commission on Training America’s Teachers
Pennsylvania Governor's Council on Physical Fitness & Sports
Pennsylvania Governor's Green Government Council
Pennsylvania Historical and Museum Commission
Pennsylvania Independent Regulatory Review Commission
Pennsylvania Juvenile Court Judges' Commission
 Pennsylvania Liquor Control Board (PLCB)
Pennsylvania Commission for Women
Pennsylvania Council on the Arts
Pennsylvania Health Care Cost Containment Council
Pennsylvania Human Relations Commission
Port of Pittsburgh Commission
Pennsylvania Public Employee Retirement Commission
Pennsylvania Securities Commission
Pennsylvania State Ethics Commission
Pennsylvania Turnpike Commission

State Related
 CareerLink
 Commonwealth System of Higher Education
 Pennsylvania State Constable's Office
 Pennsylvania State System of Higher Education (PASSHE)
 Pennsylvania Higher Education Assistance Agency (PHEAA)

Defunct departments
 Pennsylvania State Board of Censors
 Pennsylvania Department of Commerce
 Pennsylvania Department of Community Affairs 
 These two departments were merged to form the Pennsylvania Department of Community and Economic Development.
 Pennsylvania Department of Environmental Resources
 Pennsylvania Department of Forests and Water

See also
 List of municipal authorities in Pennsylvania
 List of Pennsylvania fire departments
 List of United States federal agencies
 Pennsylvania State Capitol Complex

External links
Official list of Pennsylvania state agencies

 
State agencies
Lists of government agencies in the United States